Denmark participated in the Eurovision Song Contest 2014 with the song "Cliche Love Song" written by Lasse Lindorff, Kim Nowak-Zorde, Daniel Fält and Basim. The song was performed by Basim. In addition to participating in the contest, the Danish broadcaster DR also hosted the Eurovision Song Contest after winning the competition in 2013 with the song "Only Teardrops" performed by Emmelie de Forest. DR organised the national final Dansk Melodi Grand Prix 2014 in order to select the Danish entry for the 2014 contest in Copenhagen. Ten songs competed in a televised show where "Cliche Love Song" performed by Basim was the winner as decided upon through the combination of jury voting and public voting over two rounds. 

As the host country, Denmark qualified to compete directly in the final of the Eurovision Song Contest. Denmark's running order position was determined by draw. Performing in position 23 during the final, Denmark placed ninth out of the 26 participating countries with 74 points.

Background 

Prior to the 2014 contest, Denmark had participated in the Eurovision Song Contest forty-two times since its first entry in 1957.

The Danish national broadcaster, DR, broadcasts the event within Denmark and organises the selection process for the nation's entry. Denmark has selected all of their Eurovision entries through the national final Dansk Melodi Grand Prix. Dansk Melodi Grand Prix 2014 was organised by the broadcaster in order to select Denmark's entry for the 2014 contest.

Before Eurovision

Dansk Melodi Grand Prix 2014 
Dansk Melodi Grand Prix 2014 was the 44th edition of Dansk Melodi Grand Prix, the music competition that selects Denmark's entries for the Eurovision Song Contest. The event was held on 8 March 2014 at the Arena Fyn in Odense, hosted by Louise Wolff and Jacob Riising and televised on DR1 as well as streamed online at the official DR website. The national final was watched by 1.785 million viewers in Denmark.

Format 
Ten songs competed in one show where the winner was determined over two rounds of voting. In the first round, the top three songs based on the combination of votes from a public vote and a five-member jury panel qualified to the superfinal. In the superfinal, the winner was determined again by the votes of the jury and public. Viewers were able to vote via SMS. In addition to selecting the Danish Eurovision entry, the songwriters responsible for the winning song were awarded a monetary prize of 100,000 Danish kroner by the Danish songwriting association KODA.

The five-member jury panel was composed of:
Søs Fenger – singer-songwriter
 Lars Pedersen (Chief 1) – DJ, singer and music producer
 Camille Jones – singer-songwriter and producer
 Jørgen de Mylius – television and radio host, 23-times Danish Eurovision Song Contest commentator
Mich Hedin Hansen (Cutfather) – songwriter and music producer

Competing entries 
DR opened a submission period between 20 August 2013 and 7 October 2013 for artists and composers to submit their entries. The broadcaster received a record breaking 872 entries during the submission period; the previous record was set in 2013 when the broadcaster received 692 entries. A selection committee selected six songs from the entries submitted to the broadcaster, while four of the participants were invited to compete based on editorial considerations: Anna David, Michael Rune, Nadia Malm and Sonny. The competing artists and songs were announced on 28 January 2014, while DR held a press meet and greet on 28 January 2014 where the entries were officially presented.

Final
The final took place on 8 March 2014. In the first round of voting the top three advanced to the superfinal based on the votes of a five-member jury (50%) and a public vote (50%). In the superfinal, the winner, "Cliche Love Song" performed by Basim, was selected by the public and jury vote. The viewers and the juries each had a total of 30 points to award in the superfinal. Each juror distributed their points as follows: 1, 2 and 3 points. The viewer vote was based on the percentage of votes each song achieved. For example, if a song gained 10% of the viewer vote, then that entry would be awarded 10% of 30 points rounded to the nearest integer: 3 points.

In addition to the performances of the competing entries, Danish 2013 Eurovision Song Contest winner Emmelie de Forest, Danish Eurovision 1984, 1985 and 1988 entrant Kirsten and Søren, Danish Eurovision 1989 entrant Birthe Kjær and Danish Eurovision 2001 entrant Rollo and King performed as the interval acts.

Promotion 
Basim specifically promoted "Cliche Love Song" as the Danish Eurovision entry on 5 April 2014 by performing during the Eurovision in Concert event which was held at the Melkweg venue in Amsterdam, Netherlands and hosted by Cornald Maas and Sandra Reemer.

At Eurovision
All countries except the "Big Five" (France, Germany, Italy, Spain and the United Kingdom) and the host country, are required to qualify from one of two semi-finals in order to compete for the final; the top ten countries from each semi-final progress to the final. As the host country, Denmark automatically qualified to compete in the final on 10 May 2014. In addition to their participation in the final, Denmark is also required to broadcast and vote in one of the two semi-finals. During the semi-final allocation draw on 20 January 2014, Denmark was assigned to broadcast and vote in the first semi-final on 6 May 2014.

The two semi-finals and final were broadcast on DR1 with commentary by Anders Bisgaard, who replaced Ole Tøpholm due to Tøpholm being ill. Bisgaard also commentated the broadcast of the final via radio on DR P4. The final was also broadcast on DR3 with commentary by Peter Falktoft and Esben Bjerre Hansen, and on DR Ramasjang with interpretation in International Sign for the deaf and sign language users. The Danish spokesperson, who Danish votes during the final, was Sofie Lassen-Kahlke.

Final 
Basim took part in technical rehearsals on 4 and 6 May, followed by dress rehearsals on 9 and 10 May. This included the jury final on 9 May where the professional juries of each country watched and voted on the competing entries. As the host nation, Denmark's running order position in the final was decided through a random draw that took place during the Heads of Delegation meeting in Copenhagen on 17 March 2014. Denmark was drawn to perform in position 23. Following the second semi-final, the shows' producers decided upon the running order of the final rather than through another draw, so that similar songs were not placed next to each other. While Denmark had already been drawn to perform in position 23, it was determined that Denmark would perform following Malta and before the entry from the Netherlands.

The Danish performance featured Basim dressed in a black suit and performing a choreographed routine with two dancers and three backing vocalists. The stage colours were predominantly red, orange and white and the LED screens displayed flashing strobe lights. A banner which contained the text "LOVE" was also released at the conclusion of the performance. The two dancers that joined Basim were Tobias Ellehammer and Ivan Spahi, while the three backing vocalists were: Ayoe Angelica, Andy Roda and Marcel Gbekle. Denmark placed ninth in the final, scoring 94 points.

Voting 
Voting during the three shows consisted of 50 percent public televoting and 50 percent from a jury deliberation. The jury consisted of five music industry professionals who were citizens of the country they represent, with their names published before the contest to ensure transparency. This jury was asked to judge each contestant based on: vocal capacity; the stage performance; the song's composition and originality; and the overall impression by the act. In addition, no member of a national jury could be related in any way to any of the competing acts in such a way that they cannot vote impartially and independently. The individual rankings of each jury member were released shortly after the grand final.

Following the release of the full split voting by the EBU after the conclusion of the competition, it was revealed that Denmark had placed thirteenth with the public televote and tenth with the jury vote in the final. In the public vote, Denmark scored 43 points, while with the jury vote, Denmark scored 85 points.

Below is a breakdown of points awarded to Denmark and awarded by Denmark in the first semi-final and grand final of the contest, and the breakdown of the jury voting and televoting conducted during the two shows:

Points awarded to Denmark

Points awarded by Denmark

Detailed voting results
The following members comprised the Danish jury:
 Lise Cabble (jury chairperson)songwriter, singer, composer of the 1995, 2011 and 2013 Danish contest entries "Fra Mols til Skagen", "New Tomorrow" and "Only Teardrops"
 Rune Funchguitarist, film composer
 singer
 Mich Hedin Hansen (Cutfather)music producer, songwriter
 Sys Bjerresinger

References

2014
Countries in the Eurovision Song Contest 2014
Eurovision
Eurovision
Articles containing video clips